The Sisterhood is a 2004 American supernatural horror film directed by David DeCoteau.

Plot
Two girls, Christine and Reagan, find themselves paired as college roommates. Christine, a diligent student, mourns the recent loss of her parents in an automobile accident. Reagan wants to enjoy all that college has to offer. For her, college equals sex, drugs and rock and roll.

Reagan convinces Christine to come to a Beta Alpha Tau sorority party and they both find it fun and provocative. When Christine's professor finds out that she might get accepted into the popular sorority, she urges Christine to join. The professor thinks that the sorority is a sinister force, taking souls and ruining the lives of students. If Christine can infiltrate their ranks, she might find the truth behind the sorority's power. When she gets a bid from the beautiful and powerful president of the sorority, Devin, she accepts and is introduced into a sensuous and intoxicating lifestyle.

Christine finds herself with newfound powers and delves into new pleasures. When the final initiation ceremony arrives, the stage is set for her entry into the world of darkness. The outcome is far from clear.

References

External links
 
 
  
 Information about The Sisterhood  at Regent Entertainment

2004 films
2004 horror films
2004 LGBT-related films
2000s supernatural horror films
American direct-to-video films
American LGBT-related films
American supernatural horror films
Direct-to-video horror films
Films about fraternities and sororities
Films directed by David DeCoteau
LGBT-related horror films
American vampire films
2000s English-language films
2000s American films